Corinth is a ghost town in Saluda County, South Carolina, United States. Corinth appeared on Soil Conservation Service maps as late as 1909.

References

Geography of Saluda County, South Carolina
Ghost towns in South Carolina